The CANT Z.508 was a three-engine Italian flying boat developed from the CANT Z.501 for use as a heavy bomber.

Design and development
Designed as a scaled-up three-engine version of the single-engine Z.501 for use as a heavy bomber. The aircraft was not put into production although the prototype set several world records for its class, including the lifting of a 1,000 kg (2,200 lb) load.

Specifications (Z.508)

See also

References

Z.0508
Flying boats
1930s Italian bomber aircraft
Trimotors
Parasol-wing aircraft
Aircraft first flown in 1936